Towne West Square is an enclosed shopping mall located in Wichita, Kansas, United States. The mall's three anchor stores are Dick's Sporting Goods, Dillard's Clearance Center and JCPenney. 

The original anchor stores in the mall were: Dillard's, Henry's, JCPenney, Montgomery Ward and Service Merchandise (formerly Wilson's Catalog Showroom). Henry's closed in 1988. The structure was later sealed off from the rest of the mall and currently houses 54 West Music Hall. Sears opened in 1993 (12 years after the rest of the mall) moving a store from the open air Twin Lakes Shopping Center.  Sears closed in December 2014. Their anchor store structure was taken over by Convergys and converted to office space, which was no longer accessible from the interior of the mall. In 2017, Dillard's closed their women's store anchor on the mall's north side and converted their men's store (located in the former Montgomery Ward) into a Dillard's Clearance Center. Sears Hometown, operated in the old Henry's, but closed in 2019. Later, Convergys was renamed Concentrix. In 2021, the former Concentrix space was purchased and is now MCI. 

On July 31, 2020, JCPenney put 21 stores for sale as part of their bankruptcy, this location included. The store was reaffirmed in 2021 and remains open and operating.
Towne West contains a mix of local and national retailers.

References

External links
Official website
https://zamzool.com/lets-get-to-digital-tour-of-towne-west-square/

Shopping malls in Kansas
Buildings and structures in Wichita, Kansas
Tourist attractions in Wichita, Kansas
Shopping malls established in 1981
1981 establishments in Kansas
Kohan Retail Investment Group